Eraslan Doruk (born 10 September 1949) is a Turkish boxer. He competed in the men's lightweight event at the 1972 Summer Olympics. At the 1972 Summer Olympics, he beat Luis Rodriguez and Khaidavyn Altankhuyag before losing to Alfonso Pérez.

References

1949 births
Living people
Turkish male boxers
Olympic boxers of Turkey
Boxers at the 1972 Summer Olympics
Place of birth missing (living people)
Mediterranean Games silver medalists for Turkey
Mediterranean Games medalists in boxing
Competitors at the 1971 Mediterranean Games
Lightweight boxers
20th-century Turkish people